Stephanie Ho and Saar Ahuvia, concert pianists, collaborate to perform four hand works as "Duo." Ho attended Oberlin College receiving degrees in religion and piano performance.  Both Ho and Ahuvia pursued graduate degrees in performance at the Peabody Institute of Johns Hopkins University and studied with Leon Fleisher.

Their performance repertoire is diverse. Their groundbreaking performance of Igor Stravinsky's The Rite of Spring arranged for four hands was reviewed by The New York Times. They have also performed an arrangement of Stravinsky's Petrushka, which The New York Times declared, "came through in all...visionary clarity."Duo also has a repertoire of recordings and their CD, "Bach Crossings," which was described by the Chicago Reader as a "lovely, concise recording [that] does nothing to obscure Bach's indelible melodies... It still feels very different from conventional performances of the same music: Kurtag provides a modern sensibility and heightened harmonic splendor, while Ho and Ahuvia bring a less rigid sense of time and rhythm, creating a rich fluidity."Their newest CD, "Beethoven Dialogues," includes "Beethoven's String Quartet No. 6 in G Major [which] captured the music's serenity, the melodic interplay [also] exquisitely realized."

References

Woolfe, Zachary. "A 4-Piano 'Rite' With Bang." The New York Times, 14 June 2013. Web. 30 June 2014. 
Margasak, Peter. "DUO Stephanie & Saar." Chicago Reader. Web. 30 June 2014.
Budmen, Lawrence. "Duo Stephanie and Saar Show Versatility in Dranoff Foundation Program." South Florida Classical Review RSS. Web. 30 June 2014. 

Classical piano duos
Oberlin College alumni
Peabody Institute alumni